Aliabad (also Romanized as ‘Alīābād; also known as ‘Alīābād-e Asadpoūr and ‘Alīābād-e Moḩammad Qāsem Khān) is a village in Gonbaki Rural District, Gonbaki District, Rigan County, Kerman Province, Iran. At the 2006 census, its population was 328, in 71 families.

References 

Populated places in Rigan County